Adrián Kocsis (born 25 March 1991 in Körmend) is a Hungarian striker who currently plays for Zalaegerszegi TE.

External links 
 
 MLSZ 
 HLSZ 

1991 births
Living people
People from Körmend
Hungarian footballers
Association football defenders
Zalaegerszegi TE players
NK Nafta Lendava players
Nemzeti Bajnokság I players
Hungarian expatriate footballers
Expatriate footballers in Slovenia
Hungarian expatriate sportspeople in Slovenia
Sportspeople from Vas County